Sir William Thomas Williams, QC (22 September 1915 – 28 February 1986) was a British Labour Co-operative politician.

Williams was educated at University College, Cardiff and St Catherine's College, Oxford. He was President of the South Wales University Students' Union in 1939. He was a Baptist minister and a chaplain with the Royal Air Force for returned prisoners of war. He became a barrister, called to the bar by Lincoln's Inn, and a Queen's Counsel, and was bursar and a tutor at Manchester College, Oxford.

Williams was Member of Parliament (MP) for Hammersmith South from a 1949 by-election to 1955, Baron's Court from 1955 to 1959, and Warrington from a 1961 by-election. Williams served as parliamentary private secretary to the Attorney-General from 1964. In 1969, Williams was appointed by the then-East Pakistan based Awami League, one of Bangladesh's main political factions since independence in 1971, to represent Pakistani and later-Bangladeshi politician Sheikh Mujibur Rahman in the Agartala Conspiracy Case. The military junta of Gen. Ayub Khan did not allow Williams to represent Rahman, citing domestic security and interference in sovereign matters.

In 1981, Williams, who had continued working as a barrister throughout his time in Parliament, was appointed a circuit Judge. This appointment obliged him to vacate his seat and led to a by-election at which Roy Jenkins became the first Parliamentary candidate for the Social Democratic Party, although Labour narrowly retained the seat. Williams was the last Member to vacate a seat for actual paid office until 2022, when West Lancashire MP Rosie Cooper accepted her role as the chair of Mersey Care NHS Foundation Trust.

He was knighted in the 1976 New Year Honours "for services to the Inter-Parliamentary Union."

References

Sources
Times Guide to the House of Commons 1979

External links 
 

1915 births
1986 deaths
Labour Co-operative MPs for English constituencies
UK MPs 1945–1950
UK MPs 1950–1951
UK MPs 1951–1955
UK MPs 1955–1959
UK MPs 1959–1964
UK MPs 1964–1966
UK MPs 1966–1970
UK MPs 1970–1974
UK MPs 1974
UK MPs 1974–1979
UK MPs 1979–1983
Alumni of Cardiff University
Alumni of St Catherine's College, Oxford
Knights Bachelor
Royal Air Force chaplains
World War II chaplains
Fellows of Harris Manchester College, Oxford
Politicians awarded knighthoods